Alisa Bokulich is an American philosopher of science and Professor of Philosophy at Boston University. Since 2010 she has been the Director of the Center for Philosophy and History of Science at Boston University, where she organizes the Boston Colloquium for Philosophy of Science, and serves as a Series Editor for Boston Studies in Philosophy and History of Science.  She was the first woman ever to be tenured in the Philosophy Department at Boston University and the first woman to become a director of a center for history and philosophy of science in North America.

Education 
Bokulich attended high school at Forest Ridge School in Bellevue, Washington, got her Bachelor's in Philosophy, with a minor in Physics, from Washington State University, and received her Ph.D. from the Program in History and Philosophy of Science at the University of Notre Dame, under the direction of the physicist James T. Cushing.   Her academic genealogy, traced through Ph.D. dissertation advisors, is Cushing—Max Dresden—George Uhlenbeck--Paul Ehrenfest--Ludwig Boltzmann.

Research 
Her research focuses on the history and philosophy of the physical sciences, especially classical and quantum mechanics, and more recently philosophy of the Earth sciences.  She has published widely on topics such as models, explanation, natural kinds, thought experiments, fictions in science, supertasks, and the history of quantum theory. She is the author of the book Reexamining the Quantum-Classical Relation: Beyond Reductionism and Pluralism (Cambridge University Press 2008), which has been well received by physicists and philosophers alike, and co-editor of four other books.

References

External links 
 Alisa Bokulich's Boston University website

Living people
Boston University faculty
Philosophers from Massachusetts
Philosophers of science
Washington State University alumni
University of Notre Dame alumni
Year of birth missing (living people)